Cementerio del Norte is the largest cemetery in Montevideo, Uruguay, and also the largest green park area of the city. It is located in the barrio of Casavalle in the northern-central part of the city, about 7 kilometres from the centre. To the southwest is Parque Luis Rivero and the barrio of Aires Puros. The barrio of Las Acacias lies to the east.

History
The cemetery was established in 1929. Germans who were killed in battle at sea during World War II are buried in the cemetery.

Description
The cemetery is noted for its circular "coiled" system of grave alignment in the large expanse to the north of the site. There is however a regular burial ground to the southwest of this circular patterned main site.

References

External links
 Cementerio del Norte - data
 

Cemeteries in Montevideo
1929 establishments in Uruguay